Aamir Hayat Khan Rokhri (12 August 1956  29 December 2011) was a Pakistani politician and member of the Punjab Provincial Assembly. He was a Pashtun from the Niazi tribe, a strong political family. His father, Amir Abdullah Khan Rokhri, also was a politician and a political activist from the Mianwali District. He was married to the granddaughter of the second President of Pakistan, Field Marshal Muhammad Ayub Khan. Other prominent family members of his include Gul Hameed Khan Rokhri and Humair Hayat Khan Rokhri.

Political career
Aamir Hayat was born in Lahore on 12 August 1956. He received his education from Aitchison College and FC College in Lahore, Pakistan.
Aamir Hayat Khan Rokhri was elected to the National Assembly of Pakistan in 1985 and to the Provincial Assembly as an independent candidate in 1990. He won in Pakistani general election, 2002 on the ticket of Pakistan Muslim League (Q), and in Pakistani general election, 2008 on the ticket of Pakistan Muslim League (N).

Business and sports activities
He controlled the family business, New Khan Transport Service, a transport company founded by his father. He was also the president of the Lahore City Cricket Association until 1985, secretary general of the Pakistan Badminton Federation, president of the Punjab Badminton Association, and a member of the board of directors of the Pakistan Cricket Board (PCB). He promoted cricket and badminton in Pakistan through financial contributions to PCB from 1970 to 1990.

Death and legacy
Aamir Hayat Khan Rokhri died due to a heart attack on 29 December 2011. He is survived by his three children.

References

Pakistani politicians
Aamir
2011 deaths
Pashtun people
People from Mianwali District
1956 births
Pakistani MNAs 1985–1988
Punjab MPAs 1990–1993
Punjab MPAs 2002–2007
Punjab MPAs 2008–2013
Aitchison College alumni
Pakistan Muslim League (Q) politicians
Pakistan Muslim League (N) politicians
Pakistani business executives
Pakistani sports executives and administrators